Panama competed in the Summer Olympic Games for the first time at the 1928 Summer Olympics in Amsterdam, Netherlands. One male competitor took part in two events in one sport.

Swimming

Men

References

External links
Official Olympic Reports

Nations at the 1928 Summer Olympics
1928 Summer Olympics
1928 in Panama